Under the Whyte notation for the classification of steam locomotives, 0-12-0 represents the wheel arrangement of no leading wheels, twelve powered and coupled driving wheels on six axles, and no trailing wheels.

Equivalent classifications
Other equivalent classifications are:
UIC classification: F (also known as German classification and Italian classification)
French classification: 060
Turkish classification: 66
Swiss classification: 6/6

Tender engine
The first example of the 0-12-0 was the Pennsylvania, designed by Jame Milholland for the Philadelphia and Reading Railroad and built at its own shops in 1863.  It weighed fifty tons and was, at the time, the heaviest steam locomotive in the world. It was intended to haul Pennsylvania coal trains.

Tank engines
There were only two classes of 0-12-0T locomotives:

The first was a class of three rack locomotives built by Lokomotivfabrik Floridsdorf in 1912 for use on the Erzberg Railway (Erzbergbahn) in Austria. Initially classified as class 269 by the kkStB, they passed to the BBÖ after World War I, the Deutsche Reichsbahn in 1939, and finally the ÖBB after World War II. They all stayed in service until the 1970s.

The only others of the type, was a class of ten 0-12-0T locomotives built by Hanomag in 1922 for the Bulgarian State Railways (BDŽ). They were initially numbered 4001–4010, but were renumbered 45.01 to 45.10 in 1935–1936.

References

12,0-12-0
Railway locomotives introduced in 1863